Sidney Parvin (12 July 1883 – 23 August 1956) was a British swimmer. He competed in the men's 100 metre backstroke event at the 1908 Summer Olympics.

References

1883 births
1956 deaths
British male swimmers
Olympic swimmers of Great Britain
Swimmers at the 1908 Summer Olympics
Place of birth missing
British male backstroke swimmers